The Harakiri is a slope in the ski resort of Mayrhofen Ski Zillertal 3000. It is named after the Japanese vulgar term for seppuku, ritual suicide by samurai. With incline of up to 78%, vertical drop of 375 metres and a length of about 1500 metres, it is the steepest groomed slope in Austria. Thus the slope is steeper than the initial trace of a ski jump. Because of this extreme inclination, the slope can only be maintained with a special secured slope unit.

External links 

 Mayrhofener Bergbahnen

Ski areas and resorts in Austria